The Women's 100 metre freestyle competition at the 2017 Summer Universiade was held on 21 and 22 August 2017.

Records
Prior to the competition, the existing world and Universiade records were as follows.

Results

Heats 
The heats were held on 21 August at 9:57.

Semifinals
The semifinals were held on 21 August at 19:07.

Semifinal 1

Semifinal 2

Final 
The final was held on 22 August at 20:20.

References

Women's 100 metre freestyle